Billy Brewer (1935–2018) was an American football player and head coach.

Billy Brewer may also refer to:
 Billy Brewer (baseball) (born 1968), American baseball pitcher
 Billy Brewer (footballer) (1893–1914), English footballer
 Homer Brewer (born 1934), American football safety, nicknamed Billy